On October 15, 2012, NASCAR and the Fox Sports Media Group (FSMG) announced a new $2.4 billion eight-year deal, a 30% increase from their previous deal. On July 23, 2013, NASCAR and the NBC Sports Group announced a new $4.4 billion ten-year deal. Ten days later on August 1, 2013, NASCAR and Fox extended and expanded their agreement, paying an additional $1.4 billion to do so, to complete NASCAR's new TV package through the 2024 season. NBC reportedly bid over 50% more than ESPN and Turner for their portion of the package, despite Turner and ESPN expressing interest about continuing their relationship with NASCAR.

Year-by-year summary

2020
In 2020, due to the COVID-19 pandemic after the 4th race of the season Fox started using their Charlotte Studio to the maximum extent possible to avoid travel, ensure social distancing, and limit the number of staff onsite at races. The only on-air talent onsite was at most two pit reporters per race, all other talent was stationed at the Fox Studios in Charlotte.

Also due to the COVID-19 pandemic, the NBC team initially broadcast all races from the broadcast booth at Charlotte Motor Speedway with only 1-2 pit reporters onsite. Although NBC has a small studio in Charlotte for NASCAR America segments, the studio was deemed too small to be able to do race broadcasts and maintain social distancing. For the Indianapolis race weekend, Mike Tirico hosted from the track; Tirico lives close enough to Indianapolis he was able to drive to the track to host. For the final 5 races of the season (starting with the Charlotte Roval Race) the NBC on-air team resumed travel to race sites. 

NASCAR America stopped airing when the pandemic began and has not yet returned to air. NBC has cited other conflicting live events as the reason the program has not returned to air; NBCSN aired the 2020 Stanley Cup playoffs throughout the show's timeslot in July and August.

On July 28, 2020, it was announced that Brad Daugherty would be an analyst for NASCAR on NBC from the first Michigan International Speedway race onwards. At the conclusion of the 2020 season, Krista Voda revealed on social media she would not be returning to NBC. Voda stated NBC had elected to eliminate her position from race broadcasts.

2021
On January 22, 2021, an internal memo sent by NBC Sports president Pete Bevacqua announced that NBCSN would cease operations by the end of the year, and that USA Network would begin "carrying and/or simulcasting certain NBC Sports programming," including the Stanley Cup playoffs and NASCAR races, before NBCSN's shutdown. Peacock, NBCUniversal's new streaming service, will also carry some of the network's former programming starting in 2022. The move was cited by industry analysts as a response to the impact of the COVID-19 pandemic on the sports and television industries, the acceleration of cord-cutting, as well as formidable competition from rival sports networks such as ESPN and Fox Sports 1.

During Summer Olympic years (three during the contract, in 2016, 2020, and 2024), NBC will assign different NBCUniversal channels to air races as a result of scheduling conflicts. In 2021, the Cup Series will take two weeks off to minimize any conflict with the Olympics; the Watkins Glen race will be run on the day of the Games' closing ceremony. The two Xfinity Series race that will take place during the Games (at Watkins Glen) will air on CNBC.  If a NASCAR race is postponed to Monday and it conflicts with an English Premier League match, the race will move to USA (CNBC is also unavailable on weekdays due to its stock market coverage), though this has not happened yet as of the end of the 2020 season.

References

External links
NASCAR on Fox website
NASCAR on NBC website
NASCAR Archives - Awful Announcing

2020s
Fox Sports original programming
NBC Sports
NBCSN
2020 NASCAR Cup Series
2020s in American television
2021 NASCAR Cup Series
2022 NASCAR Cup Series